Dorsa Whiston is a wrinkle ridge system at  in Oceanus Procellarum on the Moon. It is 85 km long and was named after William Whiston in 1976.

Whiston